Horn Chen (July 22, 1932 – December 7, 2015) was an American businessman and minor league sports entrepreneur. He was the founder of the Central Hockey League, which began to play in 1992. Chen was also a minority owner of the Columbus Blue Jackets in the National Hockey League.

Chen has also been the owner of the Ottawa Rough Riders as well as several minor league teams in a variety of sports, including ice hockey, baseball and football. He died in 2015 at the age of 83 in Bannockburn, Illinois where he lived.

Sports teams owned by Horn Chen

Ice hockey
Columbus Chill (ECHL)
Indianapolis Ice (IHL)
Mississippi RiverKings (CHL)
Oklahoma City Blazers (CHL)
Topeka Tarantulas (CHL)
Wichita Thunder (CHL)

Football
Memphis Xplorers (AF2)
Oklahoma City Yard Dawgz (AFL)
Ottawa Rough Riders (CFL)

Baseball
Coastal Bend Aviators (CBL)

Basketball
Fargo-Moorhead Fever (CBA)

References

Businesspeople from Chicago
Ottawa Rough Riders owners
1932 births
2015 deaths
People from Bannockburn, Illinois
20th-century American businesspeople